Taskmaster NZ is a New Zealand comedy panel game show, first broadcast in 2020 on TVNZ 2. The format for the show was created by British comedian Alex Horne during the Edinburgh Festival Fringe in 2010, and was subsequently developed into a successful UK television show in 2015.

Following the format of the original British version, the show consists of five contestants who compete in a series of strange and unusual tasks to gain points from the Taskmaster, Jeremy Wells, and adjudicated by his assistant, comedian Paul Williams.

Taskmaster NZ is produced for TVNZ, with support from NZ On Air. The first series was broadcast in summer 2020, while the second series was broadcast in the winter of 2021, and the third in winter 2022. Funding for a fourth series was confirmed in December 2022.

Cast
In the studio, other than while attempting the live task, the contestants sit on a row of chairs in alphabetical order of forename from left to right.

Key
 Series champion

Episodes

Series 1 (2020) 
The filming of the tasks was completed in March 2020, just before the COVID-19 pandemic caused a nationwide lockdown. The contestants were Angella Dravid, Brynley Stent, Guy Williams, Leigh Hart and Madeleine Sami. Dravid was the overall winner of the series, with Sami in second. Stent, in third, Hart in fourth and Williams in last place completed the standings.

Host of the original, British version of Taskmaster, Greg Davies, appears as part of the prize tasks in the seventh episode.

Series 2 (2021) 
On 30 May 2021, the contestants for series 2 were named as David Correos, Guy Montgomery, Laura Daniel, Matt Heath, and Urzila Carlson. Daniel was the overall winner of the series, with Montgomery as the runner-up, while Correos placed third, Heath placed fourth, and Carlson finished last.

Unlike the first series, ratings were reported in four-week averages rather than individually - and in consolidated ratings as opposed to overnights - but the series' audience generally improved throughout, from an average of 113,800 for the first four episodes, to an average of 165,800 for the last four episodes. The tenth and final episode, alone, received 187,700 viewers.

Series 1 contestant Angella Dravid cameoed in the tenth and final episode, as part of a task. MP Chlöe Swarbrick also appears during the first episode as part of the prize tasks.

Series 3 (2022) 
Funding from NZ On Air for a ten-episode third series was announced in April 2022, having been received months earlier. The tasks were written in February 2022. Filming for the studio shows took place in the last week of May.

The contestants for the series were announced in June 2022, and are Chris Parker, Josh Thomson, Justine Smith, Kura Forrester and Paul Ego. The series premiered on 6 July 2022; in the run-up to the series, series 1 and 2 were repeated on TVNZ Duke across the two weekends before its launch. Thomson was the overall winner of the series, with Parker as the runner-up, while Forrester placed third, Ego placed fourth, and Smith finished last. 

The series launch recorded 145,400 viewers in consolidated viewing figures. 

Series 2 contestant and writer for the show (from this series onwards) David Correos cameoed in the seventh episode as part of a task, as did athlete Eliza McCartney as part of the prize task.

Series 4 (2023) 
Funding for a fourth series was confirmed in December 2022. At the time, writer Sam Smith said he had already written at least some of the tasks for the series. No further details have been made available.

Production
Funding from NZ On Air for the first series was announced in September 2019. Prior to the filming of the studio shows for the first series, a 'warm-up episode' was shot with no studio audience - internally called "Episode Zero" - that allowed Wells and Williams to practice their roles, featuring some tasks that were going to be cut from the series proper. The studio shows were originally scheduled to film at South Pacific Pictures in Auckland in late August 2020, but were later cancelled - Auckland was moved into level 3 COVID-19 restrictions shortly beforehand - and were delayed into September. More relaxed measures were in place at time of filming, but mandated that Wells was spaced apart from the series' contestants in the studio, which Wells later remarked felt "pretty weird", and was an "unusual experience".

The second series was confirmed in March 2021, with the lineup confirmed that May. Pre-production took four weeks at the beginning of 2021, between writers Sam Smith and Williams, before moving from a studio onto Zoom after the February Auckland lockdown was put in place. During the series, to ensure contestants were unable to decipher, and thus prepare for, what a task could be prior to filming, tasks were given nicknames should they be written on call sheets. One task during the series was cut after Carlson broke her collarbone in an attempt to complete it.

Justine Smith, speaking of her experience filming the third series, noted that the entire process is very different to that of her other usual television appearances, and that "taking part in Taskmaster requires a different skill set"; she commented that it was "very secretive", with contestants not privy to witnessing tasks being set up and are unaware of "what's happening in advance". Smith recalled that she was "taken in – literally almost with a hood over [her] head – to a room [you're] not allowed to leave" before "[you] come out[,] do the task and go straight back into [your] room"; the lack of a reaction to the performance in a task troubled Smith, who commented "[y]ou turn around and walk away, [it being] a comedian's worst nightmare to not have someone tell you it was OK or laugh."

Coming up with tasks, writers Smith and Williams "abide by strict rules", in that tasks cannot be replicated from either a previous series or a version of Taskmaster from another country, and at least one task has been excised close to filming because of this. Tasks have to be submitted to and approved by producers before being presented to contestants. One task from the first series ("Make the best desert") was almost cut from broadcast because all of the contestants misread it (as "Make the best dessert"), but Stent's reaction when she re-read the task and understood it properly — which Williams called one of "the season's best moments" — convinced the producers to retain it.

Funding
Taskmaster NZ receives funding from NZ On Air, which has steadily increased each series. The first series was allocated "up to $734,953", the second "up to $792,119 plus a platform contribution reduction of $635,040", and the third confirmed for "up to $886,574".

Funding for a fourth series was confirmed in December 2022, for "up to $882,119".

Reception
The first episode received mixed to positive reviews from critics. James Croot of Stuff claimed the series was "off to a terrific start" and "you might just need to put an hour aside for the next few weeks", in contrast to comments of colleague Darren Bevan, who wrote that "while Taskmaster NZ hasn't romped away with a decisive victory, it has done enough to secure a technical win and an appointment for a second week's viewing". Bevan did offer praise, towards Paul Williams' role as the assistant, calling him "one of the show's MVPs before even 30 minutes of the first episode have passed". Stewart Sowman-Lund of The Spinoff agreed that Williams "is well-suited to the role" of the assistant. Sowman-Lund praised the first episode stating that "Taskmaster NZ starts high in the sky – and long may it continue." Karl Puschmann, writing for The New Zealand Herald did not give the show as favourable a review, stating that "it's okay. There's some good gags and it's great to see our comedians on screen. But still, it's not for me."

In a press release announcing the show's recommission, it was reported that the first series increased TVNZ 2's audience by 19% among 25-54s and more than doubled the channel's audience aged 15–34, "reach[ing] more people than any other local comedy series on air in 2020".

For the first episode of the second series, James Croot of Stuff - in contrast to his more positive comments regarding the first series - noted that, regarding the dynamic between Wells and Williams, "[t]he former still seems unsure of their relationship, the power dynamic less clear-cut than between the original's Greg Davies and Alex Horne", and that while some of the tasks "offer[ed] plenty of entertaining laughs", others were not "quite as successful". He concluded by admitting that "while Taskmaster NZ is trying to balance creating its own identity with maintaining the joy of the original, it's not always succeeding". The Spinoffs Stewart Sowman-Lund was more positive, praising the entire series as "truly hilarious", and that its contestants "will surely go down in the annals of Taskmaster history as one of the best casts the show has ever seen".

Distribution 
Taskmaster NZ was made available to stream in Sweden through SVT Play in December 2022.  It is intended to be made available on Taskmaster SuperMax+  a streaming platform dedicated to hosting Taskmaster content  at an unknown date.

References

External links 
Taskmaster NZ at TVNZ.co.nz

Taskmaster NZ at TaskMaster.Info

New Zealand game shows
2020 New Zealand television series debuts
Panel games
2020s New Zealand television series
Taskmaster (TV series)
New Zealand television series based on British television series
Television shows funded by NZ on Air
TVNZ 2 original programming
English-language television shows